Ivan Alan Roots (3 March 1921, Maidstone, Kent – 8 February 2015) was a British historian, known as the author of The Great Rebellion (1966) and a leading expert on Oliver Cromwell.

Biography
Ivan Roots was one of five sons of Frank Roots and his wife Ellen née Snashfold. He attended Maidstone Grammar School then studied at Balliol College, Oxford. At Oxford he was tutored by Christopher Hill and developed an interest in the history of England in the 17th century, especially in the period 1649–1660 and the Protestant radicals known as the Diggers. After his graduation in 1941 he joined the Royal Signal Corps and served in India and Burma. He saw action in the Battle of the Admin Box in Burma in 1944 and left the army with the rank of captain.

After WW II Roots obtained a lectureship at University College, Cardiff.

Roots was for 12 years, from the late 1970s onwards, president of the Cromwell Association (which was started in 1937 by Isaac Foot).

He married in 1947 and was the father of a son and a daughter.

Selected publications
 with Donald Pennington (ed.): The Committee at Stafford, 1643–1645 (1957)
 The Great Rebellion (1966)
 (ed.): Into Another Mould: Aspects of the Interregnum (1981)
 The Monmouth Rising (1986)
 (ed.): Speeches of Oliver Cromwell (1989)
 Cromwellian and Restoration Devon (2003)

References

External links
The Rota | Open Library

1921 births
2015 deaths
British historians
Historians of Puritanism
People educated at Maidstone Grammar School
Alumni of Balliol College, Oxford
Academics of Cardiff University
Academics of the University of Exeter
British Army personnel of World War II
Royal Corps of Signals officers